Atrium (formally known as "Atrium on Bay") is a large  retail and office complex in Toronto, Ontario, Canada. Atrium is located adjacent to Yonge-Dundas Square, and was built upon the former site of the former Ford Hotel Toronto, on the north side of Dundas Street West, extending from Yonge Street to Bay Street. The mixed-use building was constructed in 1981 with parking on the second and third underground levels and retail space street and concourse levels topped by an eight-storey office block that rises to 14 floors on the east end of the site and 13 on the west. As part of downtown Toronto's PATH network, Atrium's Concourse Level is directly connected underground to the Dundas subway station, the Toronto Eaton Centre south, across on Dundas Street. A now-closed underground tunnel connects the Atrium to the former Toronto Coach Terminal located west, across Bay Street.

In 2011, H&R Real Estate Investment Trust purchased the property from Hines Interests Limited Partnership who acquired it in 2007 from a joint venture of Brookfield Properties and The Ellman Companies. In January 2014, H&R received a zoning variance from the Toronto City Council which would allow it to add five floors to each of the office towers, expand the ground level to enclose areas now filled by a covered arcade, planters and seating areas and create additional retail space and to redesign a media tower at the southwest corner of the structure.

The Atrium houses the first Canadian location of Muji, as well as Long Tall Sally, Canada Post, Red Lobster and Rexall among other shops. The building features a variety of sit-down restaurants and a food court on the Concourse Level.

Major office tenants include the Canadian Imperial Bank of Commerce, and various arms of the Government of Ontario, including the Land Registry Office, and the Lottery Prize Claiming Centre for the Ontario Lottery and Gaming Corporation, located on ground level.

Atrium was filmed and used as a set for scenes in a shopping mall in the Canadian drama Flashpoint on the CTV Television Network. The interior was also used in the 1983 PBS TV movie Overdrawn at the Memory Bank.

References

External links
 Atrium Toronto Official Site
 Atrium Toronto  at Urbandb

Buildings and structures in Toronto
Shopping malls in Toronto
PATH (Toronto)
Hines Interests Limited Partnership
Commercial buildings completed in 1981
Office buildings in Canada